The 2008–09 RBS Twenty-20 Cup was the fourth edition of the RBS Twenty-20 Cup, a domestic Twenty20 tournament in Pakistan. It was held in Lahore from 4 to 8 October 2008. The Sialkot Stallions won their third overall and consecutive title by defeating the Karachi Dolphins in the final. As the winners, the Stallions qualified for the 2008 Champions League Twenty20, which was later cancelled.

Format
The format remained the same from the previous edition. The 13 teams are divided into four groups: Pool A with four teams, Pool B, C and D with three each. Each group plays a single round-robin tournament and the top team from each group advances to the semi-finals. The winners of the semi-finals play the final.

The position of the teams in the points table is determined by:
Total points
Won
Lost (fewest)
Net run rate

Prize money
The prize money was increased from the previous edition.

 Winners: Rs. 2,500,000
 Runners-up: Rs. 1,000,000

Results

Teams and standings
The top team from each group qualify for the semi-finals.

 Qualified for semi-finals

Knockout stage

Fixtures

Group stage
Group A

Group B

Group C

Group D

Knockout stage
Semi-finals

Final

Media coverage
 Geo Super (live)

References

External links
Tournament page on CricketArchive
Tournament page on ESPN CricInfo

Domestic cricket competitions in 2008–09
2008-09 National T20 Cup
2008 in Pakistani cricket
2009 in Pakistani cricket
Pakistani cricket seasons from 2000–01